iTunes Session is an EP by American country music group Lady Antebellum released on August 17, 2010 in the United States. The EP peaked at number 17 on the US Billboard 200.

Track listing

Charts

Release history

References

External links

2010 live albums
2010 debut EPs
Live EPs
Lady A EPs
ITunes Session